FC Jõgeva Wolves is an Estonian football club based in Jõgeva. Founded in 2014, they currently play in the II liiga, the fifth tier of Estonian football. Jõgeva Wolves also has reserve teams: FC Äksi Wolves, who play in the III liiga and FC Tallinna Wolves, who play in the IV liiga.

Players

Current squad
 ''As of 31 July 2018.

Statistics

League and Cup

References

Football clubs in Estonia
Association football clubs established in 2014
2014 establishments in Estonia